is a Japanese romantic comedy television drama series based on the original manga by Yuu Watase.

Synopsis

Riiko Izawa is an office lady in search of a boyfriend, and she ends up in possession of a "robot" known as Night Tenjo, who is programmed to be the perfect boyfriend. However, this creates a love triangle with a distinguished young man at her company who also has feelings for her. Riiko is played by Saki Aibu, Night is played by Mocomichi Hayami, and Soshi Asamoto is played by Hiro Mizushima.

Cast

 Mocomichi Hayami as Night Tenjo
 Hiro Mizushima as Soshi Asamoto
 Saki Aibu as Riiko Izawa
 Nobuo Kyo as Ishizeki
 Eisuke Sasai as Yuki Shirasagi
 Natsuhi Ueno as Mika Ito
 Kenta Satoi as Hajime Hirata
 Tsubaki Nekoze as Kyoko Adachi
 Maki Komoto as Nozomi Sato
 Masaki Kaji as Yoichiro Tanaka
 Meikyo Yamada as Shiro Asamoto
 Rie Minemura as Tetsuko Yoshioka
 Erena as Chiho Ono
 Ryosuke Sakuragi as Yasushi Morikawa
 Shoichi Watanuki as Takeru Dei
 Jingi Irie as Kota Hayashi
 Kei Yamamoto as Kazushi Asamoto
 Shunsuke Nakamura as Masashi Asamoto
 Kuranosuke Sasaki as Gaku Namikiri
 Miki Maya as Fujiko Wakabayashi

Special

On March 24, 2009, a special episode of this series was broadcast, set three years after the previous episode. Riiko had become a patissier and is engaged to Soshi Asamoto, and Night was suddenly revived by a Kronos Heaven employee, who wanted to use his individual ego to her own gain. At the end of this special episode, Night is last seen telling Namikiri to erase him from this world and shedding tears. Riiko, at last, returns to Soshi's side and their marriage goes on, but not shown on screen.

 Viewership ratings: 9.0 (Kanto)
 Broadcast date: March 24, 2009
 Air time: Tuesday 21:00-23:00

Release

The series was released on DVD in Japan on November 5, 2008. Although it was broadcast in 1080i, it was not released on Blu-ray. The DVD release does not have any subtitles.

The series was released internationally, with subtitles in English and other languages, on Viki on December 21, 2021, over 13 years since it was broadcast in Japan. It was also released in Northern America only, with English subtitles, on AsianCrush.

References

External links

 :ja:絶対彼氏

2008 Japanese television series debuts
2008 Japanese television series endings
Absolute Boyfriend
Androids in television
Fuji TV dramas
Japanese comedy television series
Japanese television dramas based on manga